John A. Yakabuski  (born June 14, 1957) is a Canadian politician who served as Ontario Minister of Natural Resources and Forestry from 2018 to 2021 in the Doug Ford cabinet. He is a Progressive Conservative member of the Legislative Assembly of Ontario who was elected in the eastern Ontario riding of Renfrew—Nipissing—Pembroke in 2003. His father, Paul Yakabuski, was also a Tory Member of Provincial Parliament (MPP) for the area from 1963 to 1987.

Background
Yakabuski is a former real estate sales representative, and was for twenty years the owner and operator of Yakabuski's Home Hardware in Barry's Bay, Ontario. At the time of his election, he was a member of the steering committee of St. Francis Memorial Hospital's Capital Equipment Campaign. He is also active in the local Lutheran church. His late brother, Kim Yakabuski, was the life partner of former Liberal Attorney-General Ian Scott. His brother, Konrad Yakabuski, is a columnist for The Globe and Mail. He and his wife Vicky have four children.

Politics
Yakabuski was elected to the Barry's Bay municipal council in 1997, and was responsible for overseeing various issues concerning the region's amalgamation. He did not seek re-election in 2000.

Yakabuski was elected to the Ontario legislature in the 2003 provincial election, defeating Liberal Derek Nighbor by 595 votes.  This result was regarded by some as an upset, as it was the only formerly Liberal seat to be won by the Tories in an election that saw the Liberals elected to a strong majority government. Moreover, the seat had been held for many years by Liberal Sean Conway (Yakabuski's second cousin). Yakabuski won the election despite publicizing of his earlier convictions by the opposition press.

In the 2007 provincial election, he was easily re-elected, defeating Liberal candidate Sean Kelly by over 15,000 votes. He was re-elected in both the 2011 provincial election and the 2014 provincial election.

Yakabuski was the Labour and Training Critic in the Official Opposition and the Whip of the Official Opposition. He ran for the position of interim leader of the party following the resignation of Tim Hudak but was passed over in favour of Jim Wilson.

Yakabuski was appointed the Minister of Natural Resources and Forestry in the Cabinet of Doug Ford. He demitted office in a cabinet reshuffle in 2021, and now serves as the Parliamentary Assistant to the Premier of Ontario.

Yakabuski was re-elected in the 2022 Ontario general election.

Electoral record

Cabinet positions

References

External links 
 

1957 births
21st-century Canadian politicians
Canadian Lutherans
Canadian people of Irish descent
Canadian people of Polish descent
Living people
Members of the Executive Council of Ontario
People from Renfrew County
Progressive Conservative Party of Ontario MPPs